Ellsbury may refer to one of the following:

 Jacoby Ellsbury, American baseball player for the New York Yankees
 Ellsbury Township, Barnes County, North Dakota, a township in North Dakota